The Schillaci Stakes is a Melbourne Racing Club Group 2 Thoroughbred horse race held under weight for age conditions, for horses aged three years old and older, over a distance of 1,100 metres at Caulfield Racecourse, Melbourne, Australia in October. Total prize money for the race is A$300,000.

History

Name
Previously known as the Chirnside Stakes it was renamed in 2000 in honour of the former champion sprinter Schillaci.

1970–1999 - Chirnside Stakes
2000 onwards - Schillaci Stakes

Distance
1970–1972 -  6 furlongs (~1200 metres)
1973–1985 – 1200 metres
 1986 – 1219 metres
1987 – 1200 metres
1988–2014 – 1000 metres
2015 – 1100 metres

Grade
1970–1978 - Principal Race
1979 onwards - Group 2

Winners

 2022 - Paulele
 2021 - Savatoxl
 2020 - Dirty Work
 2019 - Trekking
 2018 - Ball Of Muscle
 2017 - Super Cash
 2016 - Star Turn
 2015 - Alpha Miss
 2014 - Rubick
 2013 - Unpretentious
 2012 - Buffering
 2011 - Black Caviar
 2010 - Black Caviar
 2009 - Lucky Secret
 2008 - Wilander
 2007 - Gold Edition
 2006 - Miss Andretti
 2005 - Segments
 2004 - Patpong
 2003 - Halibery
 2002 - Spinning Hill
 2001 - Mistegic
 2000 - Falvelon
 1999 - Magic Music
 1998 - Show No Emotion
 1997 - Mahogany
 1996 - †Sequalo / Sword
 1995 - Moss Rocket
 1994 - Bint Marscay
 1993 - Green Sweeper
 1992 - King Marauding
 1991 - Street Ruffian
 1990 - Street Ruffian
 1989 - Scarlet Bisque
 1988 - Rancho Ruler
 1987 - Ever Ready
 1986 - Belle Spirit
 1985 - Lake Worth
 1984 - Mighty Avenger
 1983 - Qubeau
 1982 - Galleon
 1981 - Opera Prince
 1980 - Countess Marizza
 1979 - Mr.Magic
 1978 - The Judge
 1977 - Desirable
 1976 - Bold Mayo
 1975 - Tontonan
 1974 - Grey Way
 1973 - Prize Lad
 1972 - Tolerance
 1971 - Proud Toff
 1970 - Regal Vista

† Dead heat

See also
 List of Australian Group races
 Group races

References

Horse races in Australia
Open sprint category horse races
Caulfield Racecourse